Hogansaani Spring is a spring on Walker Creek in Apache County, Arizona. The Apache word Hogansaani means "the lone hogan" or "at the hogan"; thus, the name means "the spring at the hogan".

References

Springs of Arizona
Geography of Apache County, Arizona
Old Spanish Trail (trade route)